The 2009–10 Vijay Hazare Trophy was the eighth season of the Vijay Hazare Trophy, a List A cricket tournament in India. It was contested between 27 domestic cricket teams of India, starting in February and finishing in March 2010. In the final, Tamil Nadu beat Bengal by 29 runs to defend their title. This was their 4th title.

References

External links
 Series home at ESPN Cricinfo

Vijay Hazare Trophy
Vijay Hazare Trophy